Totally Frank is a comedy drama series with a real-life band as its stars on Channel 4. It follows a band, Frank, who were struggling to make it in the music industry.

Frank
The band on the show consisted of lead singer Tasha (Lauren Blake born 18 August 1983), guitarist Charlie (Bryony Afferson born 9 March 1983) keyboard player Flo (Helena Dowling born 20 December 1986) and drummer Neve (Hayley Holt born 27 February 1983). Their first single, I'm Not Shy, was released on 31 July 2006 in the UK. Their debut album, "Devil's Got Your Gold", was released on 7 August 2006 in the UK by Polydor Records.

Series
The show had two series, both of which had 13 episodes.  The DVD release of the show has been cancelled for the moment.

The series begun with the four girls taking part in fictitious reality show Fame Maker, with another girl, Sammi, who goes onto win the show.

The second series started on 9 April 2006 with storylines including Tasha leaving her solo deal, Neve and Tasha's rift, Flo breaking Jason's heart again and Charlie's dad dying.

The series was cancelled when the real band had been dropped by their record label and decided to split up on 11 September 2006.

Characters

22-year-old Tasha (Lauren Blake) is the front woman and the emotional driving force behind the band: the one with the vision and the sheer unstoppable enthusiasm to pull this thing off. Tasha automatically takes on the 'mum' role to her bandmates but she's totally clueless in matters of romance.

Tasha may have the energy, but 22-year-old Neve (Hayley Holt) is the one with the cred. She seems to know everything about every band that ever was. She's spent years gigging. She has been the drummer in a couple of bands before that ‘nearly made it’ but didn't.

Sweet and unoffensive, Flo (Helena Dowling) is the baby of the group, even though at 22 she's the same age as the others. Flo is a bit of a daddy's girl, and is torn between the grounded world of her family and fiancé and the exciting, unpredictable world of life in a band.

For 21-year-old Charlie (Bryony Afferson), being a famous musician is more important to her than being best mates with the other girls. She's deeply competitive and insecure about her songwriting around the others, particularly Neve. Charlie always assumed she'd be a solo star, not a band member.

Soundtrack

The show had a lot of performances from the band and also included some other music.

Series 1 Theme Song
Frank – Complicated

Series 1 Episode 1
Frank – Total Eclipse Of The Heart (Live)

Series 1 Episode 2
Frank – I'm Not Shy
Frank – Complicated

Series 1 Episode 3
Frank – I'm Not Shy

Series 1 Episode 4
Frank – News About You (Remix)
Frank – News About You (Live)
Frank – Complicated
Frank – News About You

Series 1 Episode 5
Frank – Complicated
Frank – Silence

Series 1 Episode 6
Bryony Afferson – Money In My Pocket (Live)
Frank – Money In My Pocket

Series 1 Episode 7
Helena Dowling – Silence (Live)
Frank – I'm Not Shy

Series 1 Episode 8
Frank – White Wedding

Series 1 Episode 9
Frank – Silence

Series 1 Episode 10
Frank – Money In My Pocket (Rock Version)
Frank – Silence
Frank – Don't Wait Up

Series 1 Episode 11
Frank – Money In My Pocket

Series 1 Episode 12
Frank – Complicated

Series 1 Episode 13
Frank – Don't Wait Up

Series 2 Theme Song
Frank – Turn It Up

Series 2 Episode 1
Lauren Blake – Tears and Tantrums
Bryony Afferson – Money In My Pocket (Live)
Frank – I'm Not Shy (Live)

Series 2 Episode 2
Frank – News About You (Alternate Mix)

Series 2 Episode 3
Kaiser Chiefs – I Predict a Riot
Frank – Closer to Me

Series 2 Episode 4
No music featured.

Series 2 Episode 5
Lauren Blake – Turn It Up (Acoustic Version)
Frank – Turn It Up

Series 2 Episode 6
Frank – Closer to Me (Lights Out Version)
Frank – Turn It Up
Frank – Closer to Me

Series 2 Episode 7
Frank – Turn It Up

Series 2 Episode 8
Michael McKell – Eye in the Sky
Frank – Turn It Up
Michael McKell and Bryony Afferson – Eye in the Sky
Bryony Afferson – Eye in the Sky

Series 2 Episode 9
The Killers – Mr Brightside
Frank – Never Left A Girl (Live)
Frank – Never Left A Girl (Alternate Mix)

Series 2 Episode 10
Frank – Turn It Up (Radio Version)
Frank – Don't Wait Up
Frank – Turn It Up (Alternate Mix)

Series 2 Episode 11
Frank – Never Left A Girl
Frank – All I Ever Do (Bryony Afferson Version)

Series 2 Episode 12
Frank – Closer to Me
Bryony Afferson – Eye in the Sky

Series 2 Episode 13
Frank – Silence (Alternate Mix)

External links
Official Frank website
Official Frank Forum
Totally Frank at Channel4.com
 

Channel 4 original programming
2005 British television series debuts
2006 British television series endings